Naruto is an anime series based on Masashi Kishimoto's manga series of the same name. The series centers on the adventures of Naruto Uzumaki, a young ninja of the Hidden Leaf Village, searching for recognitions and wishing to become the ninja by the rest of the village to be the leader and the strongest of all. The series was directed by Hayato Date, and produced by Pierrot and TV Tokyo.  The episodes are based on the first twenty-seven volumes in Part I of the manga, while some episodes feature original, self-contained storylines.

The 220 episodes that constitute the series were aired between October 3, 2002, and February 8, 2007, on TV Tokyo in Japan. The English version of the series was released in North America by Viz Media, and began airing on September 10, 2005, on Cartoon Network's Toonami programming block in the United States. On September 20, 2008, Cartoon Network ended its Toonami block, but the channel continued sporadically airing episodes of Naruto in the time slots originally occupied by Toonami's programming until January 31, 2009 when episode 209, the last episode to air in the US was shown, due to the closure of Toonami Jetstream.

On March 23, 2009, Viz stated that they were still dubbing new episodes and intended to see them aired on television. Ultimately, the final eleven episodes of the series never aired in the United States, but they were collected on DVD by Viz, which was released on September 22, 2009. The remaining eleven episodes of the English version aired on YTV's Bionix programming block in Canada from October 25 to December 6, 2009. Adult Swim's relaunched Toonami block reran the first 52 episodes in a completely uncut format from December 1, 2012, to November 30, 2013. After the 52nd episode, the series was removed from the schedule rotation to make room for its successor series, Naruto: Shippuden.

Series overview

Episode list

Season 1 (2002–03)

Season 2 (2003–04)

Season 3 (2004–05)

Season 4 (2005–06)

Season 5 (2006–07)

Releases

DVD

Blu-ray

Notes

References

External links
 Official Viz Media Naruto anime site.
 Naruto at Crunchyroll
 

Naruto
 
Episodes